Lights, Camera, Masala: Making Movies in Mumbai is a 2006 book written by Naman Ramachandran and published by India Book House. The publication was designed by Divya Thakur of Design Temple. The book's concept and photography were by Sheena Sippy. The book was awarded a Gold for Publication Design at the New York Festival in 2007 It was the author's first book. A complete insider look in the glitz, grit and grandeur of world's largest film industry, Bollywood.

Photographs of Abhishek Bachchan, Aishwarya Rai Bachchan, Salman Khan, Shah Rukh Khan, Preity Zinta and Bipasha Basu were also included. Hindustan Times review said "I flipped through this hardback on Bollywood films twice before reading a word within its glossy covers. The first time, I turned the pages quickly and curiously and I was impressed - actually blown away - because Lights Camera Masala is a design surprise"India Today Kaveree Bamzai called the book's design "distractingly overwhelming" and asked whether one should see it, read it or tear it. Ramachandran's interviews of several actors were also included. Bamzai praised the photographs by saying that they had "repose which blinds us to their ubiquity". The book had 10 chapters. They were "The spark", "The reality", "The game is afoot", "The shoot 1", "Objects of desire", "The shoot 2", "Young Turks", "From pillar to post", "Brand Bollywood" and "The people have spoken". It discussed all the steps a film is involved in before being released; script, cast selection, filming, costumes and marketing. The presentation of the content in the book is very good and catchy that binds the reader to it.

References

External links
Lights, Camera, Masala: Making Movies in Mumbai at Google Books 

2006 books
Indian books
Hindi cinema